Ian Cassar (born 20 February 1966), better known as Req (stylized as REQ), is an English DJ, record producer, and graffiti artist.

Career
In the words of AllMusic's Sean Cooper, Req began in his native Brighton as "one of the U.K.'s most respected graffiti artists." He began his graffiti work in 1984 after the Beat Street film hyped his sense to the basic tenets of hip hop. Although he was a disc jockey for many years without musical training, Req only began producing music of his own in the mid-1990s when he signed to Skint Records, who issued his earliest releases. As a graffiti artist, he had previously been a member of the largely musical collective Beats International.

His debut album, One, was critically acclaimed by such publications as The Wire and production duo Coldcut. In 2015, Fact ranked the album at number 14 in their list of "The 50 Best Trip-Hop Albums of All Time" and noted "his compositions didn't pander to the popularity of the growing trip-hop scene, instead dwelling in a noisy, near-ambient back room." His follow-up album, Frequency Jams (1998), was made an "Album Pick" on AllMusic. He released Car Paint Scheme in 2000, and Sketchbook in 2002.

Discography

Studio albums
 One (1997)
 Frequency Jams (1998)
 Car Paint Scheme (2000)
 Sketchbook (2002)

Compilation albums
 TDK (2019) 
 Tape Transport: 1994-2000 (2019)

EPs
 Req's Garden (1995)
 Miracles (1996)
 Fantasy Roc (1996)
 Split Series #7 (1999) 
 Daily Beats 1 (1999)
 Daily Beats 2 (1999)
 Daily Beats 3 (1999)
 Deqjam (2000) 
 Calypso Dark (2020)

Singles
 "Breakin' at the Seams" b/w "Concentrate and Believe" (2000)

References

External links
 

1966 births
Living people
People from Brighton
English record producers
English dance musicians
English DJs
Graffiti artists